Top Model, cycle 4 is the fourth cycle of an ongoing reality show based on Tyra Banks' America's Next Top Model that pits contestants from Poland against each other in a variety of competitions to determine who will win the title of the next Polish Top Model. 

The competition was hosted by Polish-born model Joanna Krupa who served as the lead judge alongside fashion designer Dawid Woliński, fashion show director Kasia Sokołowska and photographer Marcin Tyszka. This was the first season of the show to feature male contestants in the cast.

Among the prizes are a lucrative modeling contract with NEXT Model Management as well as an appearance on the cover of the Polish issue of Glamour and 100,000 złotys (US$30,000). The campaign with Max Factor featured in previous cycles has been dropped. 

The international destinations this cycle were Lisbon and Fuerteventura. The winner of the competition was 20-year-old Osi Ugonoh from Gdańsk.

Auditions
The auditions for season four took place from June 15 to June 27, 2014, in the cities of Gdańsk, Poznań, Katowice and Warsaw.

Contestants
(ages stated are at start of contest)

Episodes

Episode 1
Original Air Date: September 1, 2014

For the first time, the judges scout for both male and female model hopefuls to take part in the competition. The first round of auditions is held in Wilanow palace.

Episode 2
Original Air Date: September 8, 2014

The second round of audition begins, and the pool of hopefuls who will participate in the semi-finals boot camp increases.

Episode 3
Original Air Date: September 15, 2014

Final casting episode. The semifinalists take part in an inaugural runway show before being subjected to the first a round of eliminations. Later, they experience the very first photo shoot of the season. At elimination, only thirteen models are selected into the final cast.

Names in bold represent eliminated semi-finalists

Episode 4
Original Air Date: September 22, 2014

Before moving into their new home, the contestants are put to the test with their very first challenge - walking down the runway on revolving platforms. Most of the women fail to cross the entire way without falling, with the exception of Marta. Most of the male models stumble before crossing the entire way. Due to her agility on the catwalk, Marta is deemed as the winner of the challenge.

Challenge Winner: Marta Sędzicka	

Afterwards, the finalists are immediately driven to their new home. For having won the challenge, Marta is allowed to pick two contestants who will be the first to enter the house with her while the rest of the models are forced to wait outside. She chooses Ola Z. and Michał K. The following day, makeovers take place. Ola Z. and Marta have the most trouble accepting their makeovers.

For the photo shoot the models must pose in a slaughter house while they wear pieces of meat as garments incorporated into their outfits. They are overseen by judges Michał Pirog and Joanna Krupa. Marta, Michał B, Michalina, Misza and Osi all perform well on set. Ewelina feels uncomfortable posing with the meat, while Adam's repeated stabbing of one of the carcasses upsets Joanna. Michał  K. and Mateusz M. struggle the most, both finding it hard to come up with natural and diverse poses.

At panel, Michał B. receives best photo. Meanwhile, Adam, Ola and Karolina are called forward as the bottom three. Ola and Adam are declared safe, and Karolina is eliminated from the competition.

First call-out: Michał Baryza
Bottom three: Adam Boguta, Ola Żuraw & Karolina Kaczyńska
Eliminated: Karolina Kaczyńska
Featured photographer: Krzysztof Wyżyński
Special guests: Agnieszka Maciąg
Guest judge: Ania Jurgaś

Episode 5
Original Air Date: September 29, 2014

Challenge Winner: Michalina Strabel
Challenge Winner: Mateusz Jarzębiak & Osi Ugonoh

Immune: Marta Sędzicka, Mateusz Maga, Michalina Strabel, Misza Czumaczenko, Ola Żuraw & Osi Ugonoh
First call-out: Osi Ugonoh
Bottom two: Ola Grzegorczyk & Michał Kaszyński
Eliminated: Michał Kaszyński
Featured photographer: Robert Wolański
Special guests: Ewa Chodakowska, Anatol Modzelewski
Guest judge: Zuza Bijoch

Episode 6
Original Air Date: October 6, 2014

The contestants return home from the previous elimination to find a note from Michal K. written on the bathroom mirror. The models suggest that the message 'stop staring at the mirror' was directed at Mateusz M. Several of the contestants believe that Mateusz should have been eliminated instead of Michał. They continue to lay into him at dinner later that night.

For the challenge, the contestants must walk on the runway with clothing from three different designers. After being interviewed by them, they must guess what articles of clothing they are wearing belong to which designer. Mateusz M and Ewelina are able to match all of the clothes with the right designer, but it is Ewelina who is revealed to be the challenge winner.

Challenge Winner: Ewelina Pachucka	

The following day, the models are taken to a landfill for their photo shoot. Ola Z, Ewelina, Marta, Misza, and Osi all do well. Mateusz M. is asked to look less feminine in his photos, while Mateusz J. is asked to look more elegant. Michalina and Ola G struggle most.

At panel, Ewelina, Mateusz M, Misza, and Marta all receive positive feedback. Adam is chastised for the 'lack of fashion' in his photo. Michalina and Ola G receive the most negative critiques. During elimination, Misza is awarded best photo. Michalina and Ola G. land in the bottom two. Joanna hands the last photo to Michalina, who is saved due to her strong previous performances, while Ola G. is asked to leave the competition.

First call-out: Misza Czumaczenko
Bottom two: Michalina Strabel & Ola Grzegorczyk
Eliminated: Ola Grzegorczyk
Featured photographer: Adam Plucinski
Special guest: Tony Ward, Adrian Włodarski
Guest judge: Tony Ward

Episode 7
Original Air Date: October 13, 2014

Challenge Winner: Ola Żuraw
Challenge Winner/Immune: Marta Sędzicka	

Immune: Ewelina Pachucka, Marta Sędzicka, Mateusz Jarzębiak, Misza Czumaczenko & Ola Żuraw
First call-out: Ola Żuraw
Bottom two: Adam Boguta & Michalina Strabel	
Eliminated: Adam Boguta
Featured photographer: Krzysztof Opaliński
Guest judge: Kamila Szczabińska

Episode 8
Original Air Date: October 20, 2014

First call-out: Marta Sędzicka
Bottom three: Ewelina Pachucka, Mateusz Maga & Misza Czumaczenko
Eliminated: Mateusz Maga
Featured photographer: Emil Biliński
Special guest: Zosia Ślotała
Guest judge: Przemysław Saleta

Episode 9
Original Air Date: October 27, 2014

First call-out: Michał Baryza	
Bottom three: Mateusz Jarzębiak, Michalina Strabel & Misza Czumaczenko
Eliminated: Misza Czumaczenko
Featured photographer: Lara Jade
Special guest: Barbara Kurdej-Szatan, Wojciech Brzozowski
Guest judge: Kinga Rusin

Episode 10
Original Air Date: November 3, 2014

First call-out: Osi Ugonoh
Bottom three: Ewelina Pachucka, Michalina Strabel & Michał Baryza		
Eliminated: Ewelina Pachucka	
Featured photographer: Marcin Tyszka
Guest judge: Bar Refaeli

Episode 11
Original Air Date: November 10, 2014

Eliminated outside of judging panel: Ola Żuraw
First call-out: Marta Sędzicka
Bottom two: Mateusz Jarzębiak & Michalina Strabel 	
Eliminated: Michalina Strabel 	 	
Featured photographer: Mario Principe
Guest judges: Anja Rubik, Michał Piróg

Episode 12
Original Air Date: November 17, 2014

First call-out: Marta Sędzicka	
Bottom two: Mateusz Jarzębiak & Osi Ugonoh
Eliminated: Mateusz Jarzębiak

Episode 13
Original Air Date: November 24, 2014

Final three: Marta Sędzicka, Michał Baryza & Osi Ugonoh
Eliminated: Marta Sędzicka
Final two: Michał Baryza & Osi Ugonoh  	
Poland's Next Top Model: Osi Ugonoh
Guest Judge: Kasia Struss

Summaries

Call-out order

 The contestant was eliminated
 The contestant was immune from elimination
 The contestant was eliminated outside of judging panel
 The contestant won the competition

Episodes 1, 2 and 3 were casting episodes. In episode 3, the pool of semi-finalists was reduced to the final 13 models who moved on to the main competition.
Episodes 4, 8, 9 and 10 featured the bottom three contestants were in danger of elimination.
 In episode 5, Marta, Mateusz M, Michalina, Misza, Ola Ż and Osi were granted immunity from elimination at panel for having performed the best in their pair for the shoot.
 In episode 7, Marta was granted immunity as a result of having won the reward challenge. Ewelina, Mateusz J, Misza, Ola Ż (and once again Marta), were granted immunity from elimination at panel.
 In episode 11, the contestants had a casting challenge with Anja Rubik. Immediately after the challenge was over, Anja revealed that she had deemed Ola Ż to have been the worst. She was eliminated outside of judging panel as a result.

Bottom Two/Three 

 The contestant was eliminated after their first time in the bottom two
 The contestant was eliminated after their second time in the bottom two
 The contestant was eliminated after their third time in the bottom two
 The contestant was eliminated after their fifth time in the bottom two
 The contestant was eliminated outside of judging panel
 The contestant was eliminated in the final judging and placed third.
 The contestant was eliminated in the final judging and placed second.

Photo shoot guide
Episode 3 photo shoot: Beach scenarios in groups (Semifinals)
Episode 4 photo shoot: Glamour in a Slaughterhouse
Episode 5 photo shoot: Dressed and naked in Pairs
Episode 6 photo shoot: Fashion in a junkyard
Episode 7 photo shoot: Fiat 500 advertisements in pairs in the scenery of Toruń
Episode 8 photo shoot: Wild West battles
Episode 9 photo shoot: Equestrian fashion with a horse
Episode 10 photo shoots: Editorials by Marcin Tyszka; posing with Bar Refaeli
Episode 11 photo shoot: Funeral fashion editorial
Episode 12 photo shoot: Fashion in the streets of Lisbon
Episode 13 photo shoot:  Glamour magazine covers & spreads in Fuerteventura

References

 

1
2014 Polish television seasons